Kentucky Route 2056 (KY 2056), also known as Bells Lane, is a  state highway in the U.S. State of Kentucky. Its western terminus is at the end of State Maintenance in Louisville and its eastern terminus is at KY 1934 in Louisville.

Major junctions

References

2056
2056
Transportation in Louisville, Kentucky